François Heutte (born 21 February 1938) is a French former football striker. He appeared for France in the first edition of the 1960 European Nations' Cup tournament.

References

External links

1938 births
Living people
French footballers
France international footballers
Association football forwards
FC Rouen players
Lille OSC players
Racing Club de France Football players
AS Saint-Étienne players
Stade de Reims players
Ligue 1 players
1960 European Nations' Cup players